Step Conference is an annual technology festival held by Step in the United Arab Emirates. It is based on Dubai, United Arab Emirates.

History
Step Conference was founded in 2011 by Ray Dargham after graduation from college. It is owned by the Step Group, the parent company which also runs Stepfeed. Step held their first event in 2012, with hundred attendees.

In 2015, Step Conference took place at the Dubai International Marine Club. Ralph Debbas, the founder of W Motors attended the conference.

In 2017, Fahad Al Butairi, Charles Elachi, and Kim Ghattas were among the attendees of the conference.

In 2018, the event was divided into four groups, covering digital trends, artificial intelligence, autonomous technology, and financial technology.

In 2019, more than a thousand people attended the event and the value of funds that participated was about $1 billion.

In 2020, due to the COVID-19 pandemic, the event was held virtually for the first time.

In 2022, the conference was held in Dubai Internet City. Ahmad Belhoul Al Falasi, a minister of state for entrepreneurship, attended the event.

References

2011 establishments in the United Arab Emirates
Festivals in the United Arab Emirates